Ruskovce is a village and municipality in the Sobrance District in the Košice Region of east Slovakia.

References

External links
 
http://www.statistics.sk/mosmis/eng/run.html

Villages and municipalities in Sobrance District